The 1991 Gold Coast IndyCar Grand Prix was the opening round of the 1991 CART PPG Indy Car World Series, held on 17 March 1991 on the Surfers Paradise Street Circuit, Queensland, Australia. This was the first ever race for the North American–based Champ Car World Series held in the Southern Hemisphere.

Qualifying results

Race

Notes 

 Average Speed 81.953 mph

External links

Gold Coast IndyCar Grand Prix
Gold Coast IndyCar Grand Prix
Gold Coast Indy 300